Thomas Frederick Godfrey (20 June 1916 – 24 June 1984) was an English comedian and actor who mostly played working-class Cockney characters.

Variety performer 
He was born in London, and started his career as a tap dancer in variety shows, as part of the act Godfrey, Randall and Deane.   He then worked as a solo comedian, and often as a principal boy in pantomimes.

Television 
His television credits included Love Thy Neighbour, The Saint, Special Branch, The Persuaders, Mind Your Language, The Avengers, Bless This House, Till Death Us Do Part, Z-Cars, Softly, Softly, The Goodies, Steptoe and Son and On the Buses.

Films 
His film credits included Passport to Pimlico (1949), Hide and Seek (1964), Work Is a Four-Letter Word (1968), If.... (1968), Ring of Bright Water (1969), The Best House in London (1969), Simon, Simon (1970), A Severed Head (1970), Bless This House (1972), Straight On till Morning (1972), The Love Ban (1973), Love Thy Neighbour (1973), The Vault of Horror (1973), From Beyond the Grave (1974), The Adventure of Sherlock Holmes' Smarter Brother (1975), Come Play with Me (1977) and The Great Muppet Caper (1981).

Filmography 
Passport to Pimlico (1949) – Bus Conductor
The Flaw (1955) – Theatregoer (uncredited)
 Scotland Yard (film series) – The Grand Junction Case (1961) – Smaller
The Missing Note (1961) – Sam
Hide and Seek (1964) – Drunken Songwriter
The Christmas Tree (1966) – stranded Motorist. (uncredited)
Work Is a Four-Letter Word (1968) – Mr. Thacker
If.... (1968) – School Porter (uncredited)
Till Death Us Do Part (1969) – Knowledgeable man in pub
Ring of Bright Water (1969) – Ticket seller
The Best House in London (1969) – News Vendor (uncredited)
A Severed Head (1970) – Removal Man (uncredited)
Simon, Simon (1970) – Cashier
Straight On till Morning (1972) – Mr. Godfrey
Bless This House (1972) – Alf Murray
The Love Ban (1973) – Barber #2
The Vault of Horror (1973) – Landlord (segment 5 "Drawn and Quartered")
Love Thy Neighbour (1973) – Arthur
From Beyond the Grave (1974) – Mr. Jeffries (segment 1 "The Gate Crasher")
The Adventure of Sherlock Holmes' Smarter Brother (1975) – Fred
Come Play with Me (1977) – Blitt
The Great Muppet Caper (1981) – Bus Conductor

References

External links 
Tommy Godfrey – BBC Guide to Comedy

1916 births
1984 deaths
Male actors from London
English male film actors
English male television actors
20th-century English male actors